Tacoma Airport may refer to:
Seattle–Tacoma International Airport, international airport
Tacoma Narrows Airport, public use airport